Pivovara Ličanka (lit. "Brewery of Lika") is a brewery in Donje Pazarište, Croatia. It was founded in 1997 by Karlo Starčević. , its annual production is one million liters.

They produce the following

brands of beer:
 Velebitsko
 Velebitsko Tamno

References

External links
 Pivovara Ličanka
 http://www.ratebeer.com/brewers/pivovara-ličanka/2383/
 http://www.bottledbeer.co.uk/index.html?beerid=2013
 Pivo iz Pazarišta po recepturi iz 1842. godine 

Licanka
Food and drink companies established in 1997
Lika-Senj County
1997 establishments in Croatia